Ahn Joon-sung (born 25 August 1997) is a South Korean judoka.

He participated at the 2018 World Judo Championships, winning a medal.

References

External links
 

1997 births
Living people
South Korean male judoka
Judoka at the 2018 Asian Games
Asian Games bronze medalists for South Korea
Asian Games medalists in judo
Medalists at the 2018 Asian Games